The Hits/The B-Sides is a box set by American recording artist Prince. It was released on September 10, 1993, by Paisley Park Records and Warner Bros. Records. The album is a comprehensive three-disc set consisting of many of his hit singles and fan favorites.

Album information
In 1993, Prince wanted to release Goldnigga, the debut album by his band The New Power Generation, but Warner Bros. refused and instead decided to finally release the greatest hits collection they had wanted to release two years earlier when Prince instead got Diamonds and Pearls released.

Discs one and two were released separately, under the titles The Hits 1 and The Hits 2 respectively, but The B-Sides disc could only be obtained by purchasing the full set. The separate Hits discs and the full set were all released on the same day. Most of the songs (A-side and B-sides) on The Hits/The B-Sides are represented in their edited single form. Exceptions to this were "Alphabet St.", "7", "Little Red Corvette", "Sexy MF", "Let's Go Crazy", and "Purple Rain". This compilation marks the first time the single version of "Kiss" was made available on CD. The third disc of B-sides also featured the 7-inch edits, with the exceptions of "200 Balloons", "17 Days", "Gotta Stop (Messin' About)", "Horny Toad", "Irresistible Bitch", "I Love U in Me", "God", and "How Come U Don't Call Me Anymore?" which were all original full-length recordings from the original singles.

Among the previously unreleased material was the rare live version of "4 the Tears in Your Eyes", only previously released in a 1985 TV broadcast for the Live Aid concerts. Also included was a live version of "Nothing Compares 2 U", recorded live January 27, 1992, at Paisley Park with The New Power Generation. The other four new tracks were outtakes. The oldest track was "Power Fantastic", a moody ballad once considered for the Dream Factory project of 1986. Another ballad, "Pink Cashmere", was broadcast before some of the Lovesexy World Tour shows, dating it back to 1988 originally for his abandoned Rave Un2 the Joy Fantastic project. "Peach" was regularly played on the Act I Tour (1993) and "Pope" was played live during some 1993 after shows. "Pope" was actually in the short-lived musical ballet Glam Slam Ulysses, which also spawned several songs later released on Come, The Gold Experience and Crystal Ball. Live jams of "Peach" often extended into the title track of Chaos and Disorder.

While Prince had very little interest in the project, he insisted that his longtime manager Alan Leeds write the liner notes instead of Rolling Stone journalist Neal Karlen. According to Prince biographer Per Nilsen, the record company paid Prince to not get involved with the making of this compilation.

Commercial performance
In the United States the album debuted at number 19 on the Billboard 200  the week of October 2, 1993, with more than 87,000 copies sold combining the two abbreviated versions, Hits 1 and Hits 2; the last two debuted at numbers 46 and 55, respectively, the same week. The next week, the album dropped to number 32 on the chart. It was present on the chart for 18 weeks.

The week following Prince's death, the album sold 40,000 equivalent copies (24,000 in pure album sales) thus allowing the album to re-enter the Billboard 200 at number 6. The next week it sold 106,000 units and hit a new peak of number four on the chart. The album was certified platinum by the RIAA on September 14, 1993, for shipments of one million.

As of April 2016 Hits 1 has sold 1,451,000 copies and Hits 2 sold 1,738,000 units according to Nielsen SoundScan, combined, they sold over 3,189,000 copies in the United States.

In the United Kingdom the album debuted and peaked at number four the week of September 25, 1993, the next week it fell off to number 12 and remained on the chart for 18 weeks. Hits 1 debuted and peaked at number five on September 25, 1993, while Hits 2 opened at number six the same weeks and two weeks later it reached and peaked at number five. The Hits/The B Sides was certified gold by the BPI on July 22, 2013, denoting shipments of 100,000 units.

Track listing 
All songs performed by Prince, except where noted.

Disc one: The Hits 1

Disc two: The Hits 2

Disc three: The B-Sides

Charts

The Hits/The B-Sides

Weekly charts

Year-end charts

The Hits 1

Weekly charts

Year-end charts

The Hits 2

Weekly charts

Year-end charts

Certifications

Release history

See also 
The Hits Collection, accompanying home video of select music videos from Prince.

References 

1993 greatest hits albums
Prince (musician) compilation albums
Albums produced by Prince (musician)
Paisley Park Records compilation albums
Warner Records compilation albums
B-side compilation albums
Albums recorded at Sunset Sound Recorders